René Fonjallaz (1907 – 26 December 1993) was a Swiss bobsledder who competed in the late 1920s and early 1930s. He won the silver medal in the four-man event at the 1931 FIBT World Championships in St. Moritz. Fonjallaz also finished eighth in the five-man event at the 1928 Winter Olympics in St. Moritz.

References

External links
 
 1928 Winter Olympic five-man results
 Bobsleigh four-man world championship medalists since 1930

1907 births
1993 deaths
Bobsledders at the 1928 Winter Olympics
Swiss male bobsledders
Olympic bobsledders of Switzerland
20th-century Swiss people